Wall Street Kid is a video game released by SOFEL for the NES.

The storylines of the two versions are different but the layout and the scheme of the office are almost exactly the same. Only cosmetic changes were made to make it relevant with the North American audiences. Both of these games expect the player to have the playable character exercise and go out on dates.

The player must prove the stockbroker's worth by taking $500,000 in seed money and growing it to $1,000,000 in order to gain a six-hundred-billion-dollar inheritance (equal to $ billion today) from the extremely wealthy Benedict family. Successfully investing it in the American stock market results in rewards like going shopping on the weekend and being able to acquire expensive items such as a house. The names of the companies listed in the stock market are slight variants on actual U.S. companies in operation at the time of the game's release.  The player is also encouraged to spoil the stockbroker's girlfriend. The game ends if the player is unable to raise the money needed for a key item such as a boat or the house, causing the stockbroker to be disowned by the family.

Reception

In the "Nintendo Player" section, Electronic Gaming Monthly described it as "one of the most unique RPGs" that they saw at the Consumer Electronics Show. In a retrospective review, Game Informer wrote that the game featured "funny dialogue and addicting nature of money-making." Meanwhile, Jeff Irwin of AllGame referred to the game as "smooth and enjoyable" and compared the game to Brewster's Millions.

References

External links
 Wall Street Kid at MobyGames

1989 video games
Business simulation games
Nintendo Entertainment System games
Nintendo Entertainment System-only games
Social simulation video games
SOFEL games
Video games set in New York City
Video games developed in Japan
Video game sequels
Economics in fiction
Manhattan in fiction
Single-player video games